Quintus Lucretius Vespillo was a Roman senator and consul, whose career commenced during the late Roman Republic and concluded in the reign of emperor Augustus. 

Lucretius served as a soldier under Pompey in 48 BC. His father, an orator and jurist also named Quintus Lucretius Vespillo, had been proscribed by Sulla and murdered. In 43 BC the younger Lucretius was also proscribed, by the Second Triumvirate; his wife Curia saved his life by concealing him in their house at Rome. Lucretius remained in hiding, living in a crawlspace above his bedroom ceiling, until the political efforts of his friends secured him a pardon. In 20 BC he participated in a delegation which the Senate sent to Augustus in Athens, requesting on behalf of the Roman people that the emperor assume the consulship in the following year. Ultimately Augustus did not accede to this request, and Lucretius himself served as consul in 19 BC, with Gaius Sentius Saturninus as his colleague. 

He was in the past believed to be the author of the Laudatio Turiae, a tombstone engraved with an epitaph in the form of a husband's eulogy for his wife but this is rejected by modern scholars.

See also
List of Roman Consuls

Footnotes

References 
Cicero, Brutus 48
Julius Caesar Commentarii de Bello Civili iii 7
Appian B.C. iv 44
Valerius Maximus vi. 7.2
Dio Cassius liv 10

Suffect consuls of Imperial Rome
1st-century BC Romans
Lucretii